Artificial Unintelligence: How Computers Misunderstand the World is a 2018 American book, a guide to understanding the inner workings and outer limits of technology and why we should never assume that computers always get it right. It won the 2019 Prose Award in the Computing and Information Sciences category, and has been widely reviewed.

Overview 
Meredith Broussard is a data journalism professor at the Arthur L. Carter Journalism Institute at New York University. Her research focuses on the role of artificial intelligence in journalism. Broussard has published features and essays in many outlets including The Atlantic, Harper’s Magazine, and Slate Magazine. 

Broussard has published a wide range of books examining the intersection of technology and social practice. Her book Artificial Unintelligence: How Computers Misunderstand the World, published in April 2018 by MIT Press, examines the limits of technology in solving social problems. A review in Times Higher Education states that

Reception 
Artificial Unintelligence: How Computers Misunderstand the World won the 2019 Prose Award in the Computing and Information Sciences category.

Positive reviews appeared in The Philadelphia Inquirer, American Scientist, ZDNet, and in the Royal Society of Chemistry's publication, Chemistry World. Dr. Broussard has given talks based on her book at the international meeting of the History of Science Society and, on a lecture series inspired by her work, as the keynote speaker for "AI: The Future is Now" at Central Washington University.

References 

2018 non-fiction books
American non-fiction books
Artificial intelligence publications
Works about security and surveillance
MIT Press books